The Sonnenstein Euthanasia Clinic (literally "National Socialist Killing Institution Sonnenstein") was a Nazi euthanasia or extermination centre located in the former fortress of Sonnenstein Castle near Pirna in eastern Germany, where a hospital had been established in 1811.

In 1940 and 1941, the facility was used by the Nazis to exterminate around 15,000 people in a process that was labelled as euthanasia.  The majority of victims were suffering from psychological disorders and intellectual disability, but their number also included inmates from the concentration camps. The institute was set up after the beginning of the Second World War as part of a Reich-wide, centrally coordinated and largely secret programme called Action T4 for the "Elimination of life unworthy of life" (Vernichtung lebensunwerten Lebens) or the killing of what the Nazis called "dead weight existences" (Ballastexistenzen). Today, the Pirna Sonnenstein Memorial Site (Gedenkstätte Pirna Sonnenstein) stands to commemorate the victims of these crimes.

The Nazi euthanasia facility at Sonnenstein Castle also supported the personnel as well as the organisational and technical preparation of the Holocaust. It was one of six that were in operation in Saxony, and was—not least due to the number of victims—one of the worst sites of Nazi war crimes in the state.

The methods of gassing prisoners at Sonnestein were later adopted at Auschwitz to exterminate inmates.

Early history 
The former castle site and fortress was converted in 1811 into an institute for mentally ill patients who were assessed as curable. It had a good reputation due to its psychiatric reform concept. The general practitioner and first director of this hospital was Ernst Gottlob Pienitz. Between 1855 and 1914 the institute was expanded with numerous extensions. From 1922 to 1939 the national nursing college (Pflegerschule) was moved to Sonnenstein.

In 1928, Hermann Paul Nitsche was appointed as the director of the Sonnenstein Mental Institution (Heilanstalt Sonnenstein) which had now grown to over 700 patients. Under his tenure a systematic exclusion of chronically mentally ill patients began. As an advocate of racial hygiene and euthanasia he carried out compulsory sterilisations, questionable compulsory medical procedures and food rationing on patients with "hereditary" diseases. In autumn 1939, the institute was closed to the public in a decree by Saxon Interior Minister and set up as a military hospital and resettlement camp.

Systematic killing of patients 

As part of what later became the so-called Action T4, six death institutes were set up in 1940 and 1941 across the German Reich under the direction of the branches of the Nazi Party, overseen by a specially-created control centre for the extermination programme, established at Tiergartenstraße 4 in Berlin. These institutes were responsible for gassing 70,000 mentally ill and mentally retarded patients from psychiatric institutions, old peoples homes, nursing homes and hospitals. One of these extermination clinics was located in Pirna-Sonnenstein under the direction of the doctor, Horst Schumann. His successors were Kurt Borm (code name "Dr. Storm"), Klaus Endruweit (code name "Dr. Bader"), Curt Schmalenbach (code name "Dr. Palm") and Ewald Wortmann (code name "Dr. Friede").

In spring 1940 the Berlin euthanasia department had a killing centre established in a screened-off part of the institute's land. In the cellar of a hospital building – Haus C 16 - a gas chamber was installed and a crematorium attached. The complex of four buildings was surrounded by a wall on the sides facing the Elbe river and a car park - still largely in place today. On the remaining sides a high board fence was erected to hide what was going on inside.

At the end of June 1940 the extermination institute began operations. In the years 1940 and 1941 it had a total of about 100 employees: doctors, nurses, drivers, orderlies, office workers, police. Several times a week, patients were fetched from mental and nursing homes in buses and brought to the Sonnenstein. After passing the entrance gate to the institute, which was guarded by a police detachment, the victims were taken to the ground floor of Block C 16 where they were separated into reception rooms for men and women by orderlies. In another room they were presented one by one, usually to two doctors from the institute, who then fabricated a cause of death for the subsequent death certificate.

Following their "examination" the victims had to undress in another room under the supervision of nurses and orderlies. Next 20 to 30 people were taken down to the cellar under the pretext that they were going for a shower. There they were led into a gas chamber fitted out like a shower room with several shower heads in the ceiling. Then staff closed the steel door to the gas chamber. An institute doctor came down, opened the cock on a carbon monoxide cylinder and watched the death process that, depending on build and endurance, took about 20 to 30 minutes.

After about 20 more minutes, the gas was extracted and the corpses collected from the gas chamber by "stokers" and cremated in two coke ovens supplied by the firm of Kori from Berlin. Before cremation, selected patients were dissected by the doctor and any gold teeth removed. The ashes of the victims were dumped on the institute rubbish dump or simply shovelled over the bank of the River Elbe behind the building at night.

The Sonnenstein Registry Office (Standesamt Sonnenstein) sent families of the victims a death certificate with falsified causes of death and a standard "letter of condolence". Men and women of all ages and even children were killed at Sonnenstein, including those from the Katharinenhof in Saxony's Großhennersdorf and from the Chemnitz-Altendorf State Institute. The patients killed at Sonnenstein came from the whole of Saxony, Thuringia, Silesia, East Prussia (e.g. from the Provincial Mental Sanatorium Kortau) and parts of Bavaria. Until 24 August 1941, when Adolf Hitler, probably for internal political reasons, issued the "Euthanasia Stop" order, a total of 13,720 mentally ill and mentally retarded people were gassed under Action T4 at Pirna-Sonnenstein.

Precursor to the "Final Solution" 
In addition, in summer 1941 more than one thousand inmates from concentration camps were executed at Pirna-Sonnenstein as part of Action 14f13. At the time the camps did not have their own gas chambers. The scale of prisoner transportation to Sonnenstein is still not fully known. Records show transportations from the concentration camps of Sachsenhausen, Buchenwald and Auschwitz. The mass gassing of almost 600 inmates from the Auschwitz concentration camp at the end of July 1941 marked the transition to a new dimension in war crime.

In the first half of 1942 extermination camps for Polish and European Jews were established, especially in East Poland, under Operation Reinhard, that were able to draw on the experience gained under Action T4. About a third of the employees at the Sonnenstein Death Institute were deployed during 1942 and 1943 to the extermination camps of Bełżec, Sobibor and Treblinka.

Traces removed 

During the summer of 1942 the euthanasia institute of Sonnenstein was dissolved and the gas chamber and crematorium dismantled. After careful removal of the traces of the crime, the building was used from the end of 1942 as a military hospital by the Wehrmacht. In the so-called Dresden Doctors' Trial in the summer of 1947 some of the participants in the killings at Sonnenstein were held to account. The Dresden jury sentenced to death Hermann Paul Nitsche, who from spring 1940 was one of the medical directors in charge of the extermination of patients in the German Reich, as well as two of the Sonnenstein nurses.

After the doctors' trial, the crimes committed were rarely mentioned in Pirna. During the time of East Germany, the story was repressed and largely concealed for four decades. On the Sonnenstein site a large factory was built that was kept shielded from the public; the firm used the buildings of the death centre.

Number of victims 

According to surviving internal T4 statistics, in the Sonnenstein Euthanasia Centre in 15 months between June 1940 and 1 September 1941 a total of 13,720 people were executed in the gas chamber:

These statistics only cover the first phase of Action T4, that was ended by an order from Adolf Hitler on 24 August 1941. After the temporary interruption of Action T4, a further 1,031 concentration camp prisoners from Buchenwald, Sachsenhausen and Auschwitz were executed in Sonnenstein under the code name "Special treatment 14 f 13". One of the best-known victims was the Dresden artist, Elfriede Lohse-Wächtler. Likewise the church solicitor Martin Gauger, who came from Buchenwald concentration camp, was murdered in Sonnenstein under 14f13.

Establishment of the memorial centre 
After the death centre closed in 1941, the Adolf Hitler School (Adolf-Hitler-Schule Gau Sachsen), a Reich Administration School and a Wehrmacht military hospital were established on the site and lasted until 1945. Following the end of the Second World War, it became a refugee camp, quarantine camp for released members of the Wehrmacht, part of the Landrat office and a police school. These remained until 1949, with the exception of the police school which lasted until 1954.

From 1954 to 1991 a large part of the site was used by a continuous-flow machine manufacturer to build aircraft turbines. In 1977 the Pirna District Rehabilitation Centre was established in the castle area. In 1991 this grew into a workshop for handicapped people under the sponsorship of the workers' charity, Arbeiterwohlfahrt.

Not until autumn 1989 did its historic events gradually sink into the public consciousness in the town. On 1 September 1989, the 50th anniversary of the start of the Nazi extermination programme, a small exhibition about Action T4 by the historian Götz Aly was held, at the initiative of several townsfolk interested in bringing the subject to light. The exhibition generated a lot of public interest. As a result, there was a citizens' initiative to create a suitable memorial site to the victims of the Nazi euthanasia crimes at Sonnenstein. In June 1991 a society for the site was formed, the Kuratorium Gedenkstätte Sonnenstein.

Based on searches of the archives and archaeological investigations carried out from 1992 to 1994, the cellar rooms used for the exterminations in Haus C 16 were reconstructed in 1995 and arranged as a memorial centre (today building Schlosspark 11). The exhibition is located in the attic of the same building. On behalf of the Saxon Memorial Foundation, a permanent exhibition to remember the victims of political tyranny was created to document the crimes. It was opened to the public on 9 June 2000.

The memorial centre today 
Today the site is part of the memorial known as "Vergangenheit ist Gegenwart" ("The Past is the Present") created by Berlin artist Heike Ponwitz. All the boards carry a motif of the Sonnenstein Fortress based on a painting by the Electorate of Saxony court painter Bernardo Bellotto (1721-1780). Each board takes a theme connected with Nazi euthanasia war crimes, such as collective transport, letter of condolence, special treatment or bathroom.

The project is the result of a competition to erect a memorial for the 15,000 victims of Sonnenstein.

References

Sources 
 Böhm, Boris: Geschichte des Sonnensteins und seiner Festung, publ. by Kuratorium Gedenkstätte Sonnenstein, Pirna, 1994
 
 Kuratorium Gedenkstätte Sonnenstein e.V. u. Sächsische Landeszentrale für politische Bildung (pub.): Nationalsozialistische Euthanasieverbrechen in Sachsen. Beiträge zu ihrer Aufarbeitung. Dresden, Pirna 1993 and 2nd heavily amended edition of 1996; 2004, . (Collection of individual articles.)
 Kuratorium Gedenkstätte Sonnenstein e.V. (publ.): Von den Krankenmorden auf dem Sonnenstein zur "Endlösung der Judenfrage" im Osten. Pirna, 2001.
 Frank Hirschinger: Zur Ausmerzung freigegeben. Halle und die Landesheilanstalt Altscherbitz 1933-1945. Böhlau, Cologne, 2001, .
 Daniela Martin: "... die Blumen haben fein geschmeckt". Das Leben meiner Urgroßmutter Anna L. (1893-1940) Schriftenreihe Lebenszeugnisse - Leidenswege, Heft 21, Dresden, 2010; .
 Thomas Schilter: Unmenschliches Ermessen. Die nationalsozialistische "Euthanasie"-Tötungsanstalt Pirna-Sonnenstein 1940/41. Gustav Kiepenheuer Verlag, Leipzig, 1998. 319 pages, .

Other bibliography see main article: Action T4

External links 

 Pirna-Sonnenstein Memorial Site
 The Euthanasia War Crimes at Sonnenstein in Pirna
 Kuratorium Gedenkstätte Sonnenstein e.V.
 Art project Denkzeichen
 Artistic biography of Elfriede Lohse-Wächtler

Aktion T4 euthanasia centres
Nazi eugenics
Pirna